Lycosa yerburyi, is a species of spider of the genus Lycosa. It is endemic to Sri Lanka.

See also 
 List of Lycosidae species

References

Lycosidae
Endemic fauna of Sri Lanka
Spiders of Asia
Spiders described in 1901